For the People is an American legal drama that aired from January 31 until May 9, 1965. The series starred a pre-Star Trek William Shatner as a New York City prosecutor. It was shot on location in New York.

Premise
William Shatner played assistant district attorney David Koster in New York City.

Cast
William Shatner as David Koster, an assistant district attorney
Howard Da Silva as Anthony Celese, a district attorney and Koster's boss
Lonny Chapman as Frank Malloy, a police detective
Jessica Walter as Phyllis Koster, David's wife

Episodes

Cancellation
The series was canceled after its first season. The cancellation left Shatner free to accept the role of Captain James T. Kirk on Star Trek.

References

External links

1965 American television series debuts
1965 American television series endings
1960s American legal television series
English-language television shows
Black-and-white American television shows
CBS original programming
Television shows set in New York City
Television series by CBS Studios
Television series about prosecutors